Jiří Schmitzer (born 25 October 1949) is a Czech actor and musician, the son of actor Jiří Sovák. He is a four-time holder of the Czech Lion Award for Best Actor in a Leading Role.

Biography

Career
Schmitzer graduated from the Theatre Faculty of the Academy of Performing Arts in Prague in 1974, after which he performed at the Činoherní studio in Ústí nad Labem. From 1985, he was a member of the Studio Ypsilon ensemble in Liberec.

Schmitzer made his television debut in 1966 with the series Eliška a její rod. He first appeared onscreen in the 1967 production Kinoautomat, considered the world's first interactive movie.
He played prominent roles in such films as Marecek, Pass Me the Pen! (1976), Cutting It Short (1980), The Snowdrop Festival (1984), Černí baroni (1992), and the television series Chalupáři (1975) and Sanitka (1984).
In 1997, Schmitzer won his first Czech Lion Award as Best Actor in a Leading Role for the television film Bumerang (1997). He has since won the award three more times, for the films Beauty in Trouble (2006), Jako nikdy (2013), and Staříci (2019).

Schmitzer is also a composer, having written music for a number of theatrical productions and films. He is additionally a singer and guitarist, performing humorous folk songs. He has released four studio albums. In 2008, Schmitzer published a collection of his texts in a book titled Kanimůra ze Šardonu.

Personal life
In 1976, under the influence of alcohol, Schmitzer caused a car accident in which a pedestrian died. He was sentenced to three years in prison and released after a year and a half for good behaviour. His father, Jiří Sovák, never forgave him for this, cutting off all contact with his son and eventually disowning him.
Prior to the accident, Schmitzer had acted in several productions with his father, including the film Marecek, Pass Me the Pen! and the series Chalupáři. In the film they played son and father and in the series, the two played grandson and grandfather, respectively. In the 1977 sci-fi comedy Tomorrow I'll Wake Up and Scald Myself with Tea, Schmitzer voiced a younger version of his father's character.

Selected filmography

Discography
 Recitál (1997)
 Šílenec (2000)
 Bouda (2003)
 Sbírka kiksů (2008)

References

External links

 

1949 births
Living people
Male actors from Prague
Czech male film actors
Czech male television actors
20th-century Czech male actors
21st-century Czech male actors
20th-century Czech male singers
Folk-pop singers
Academy of Performing Arts in Prague alumni
Czech male stage actors
Czech Lion Awards winners
Czech prisoners and detainees
21st-century Czech male singers